Alice Burke may refer to:

 Alice Burke (politician) (1892–1974), American politician who was the mayor of Westfield, Massachusetts
 Alice Burke (footballer) (born 2002), Australian rules footballer